Kitade is a surname. Notable people with the surname include:

Nana Kitade (born 1987), Japanese singer-songwriter and musician
Naohiro Kitade (born 1973), Japanese football player
Takuya Kitade (born 1992), Japanese rugby union player
Tsutomu Kitade (born 1976), Japanese football player